Martina Hingis and Sania Mirza were the defending champions, but chose not to participate this year.
Caroline Garcia and Kristina Mladenovic won the title, defeating Bethanie Mattek-Sands and Lucie Šafářová in the final, 6–2, 7–5.

Seeds

Draw

External links 
 Main draw

Volvo Car Open - Doubles
Charleston Open